The Battles of Jijiga was a series of battles that was part of the Ogaden War. The battles were fought in Jijiga, Ethiopia and was one the largest battles of the conflict.

History

First Battle of Jijiga (September 1977)
In mid-September 1977, during the Somali invasion of the Ethiopian Somali region, Somalia National Army forces attacked the Ethiopian held garrison in Jijiga. By September more than 90% of Somali Region was in SNA control and on September 12 the Somalia forces captured Jijiga, a strategic success. Jijiga overlooked the nearby Marda Pass where Ethiopian troops were entrenched, halting any further Somali advance deeper.

Local defenders at Jijiga garrison consisted of roughly 25,000 Ethiopian infantrymen. The SNA attack on Jijiga came the same day Dire Dawa came under siege. 

The Ethiopian army had begun to receive Soviet aid by the time of the battle, however morale was low and when a British journalist visited the battlefield afterwards, he claimed that large quantities of weapons had been abandoned by fleeing Ethiopian forces.

124 Somali tanks, mostly T-55s, defeated 108 Ethiopian tanks, mainly M47 Pattons and M41 Walker Bulldogs. The Ethiopians lost 43 tanks during the battle, including 11 T-34/85 and 32 US made tanks as well as 28 Armoured personnel carriers.

References

Battles involving Ethiopia
Battles involving Somalia
Jijiga
Conflicts in 1977
Conflicts in 1978
1977 in Ethiopia
1978 in Ethiopia